Paula Veronica Welander is a microbiologist and professor at Stanford University who is known for her research using lipid biomarkers to investigate how life evolved on Earth.

Early life and career 
Welander was born and raised in the San Fernando Valley. Her mother and father immigrated from Mexico to Los Angeles in the early 1970’s. She received her undergraduate degree from Occidental College in Los Angeles in 1998. She has a master's degree (2003) and a Ph.D. (2007) from the University of Illinois at Urbana-Champaign. She went on to do postdoctoral studies at Massachusetts Institute of Technology in the Departments of Biology and of Earth, Atmospheric, and Planetary Sciences. Welander began her position at Stanford University in 2013, and was awarded tenure in 2019.

Research 
Welander's graduate research examined factors controlling the use of methane by a group of Archaea. For her postdoctoral research, she examined the production of a group of chemical compounds known as hopanoids. Welander has examined lipids in acid-loving archaea and how changes in the lipids alter a cell's ability to grow. Her research has further expanded our understanding of the organisms that produce triterpenoid lipids in aquatic environments. Her more recent research centers on lipids, known as glycerol dibiphytanyl glycerol tetraethers (GDGTs), that are found in archaeal cell walls. Collectively, her research on lipids can be used to characterize how microbial life on Earth has changed over time.

Honors and awards 
In 2018, Welander received the Geobiology and Geomicrobiology Division Award for Outstanding Research from the Geological Society of America. She also received a CAREER award from the National Science Foundation.

Selected publications

References

External links 

Living people
Occidental College alumni
University of Illinois Urbana-Champaign alumni
Stanford University faculty
Women microbiologists
Women geologists
Geobiologists
Year of birth missing (living people)